The Heysham to M6 Link Road, known as the Bay Gateway, is a  dual carriageway link road between the Heysham and Morecambe peninsula to Junction 34 of the M6 motorway in Lancashire, England. It was opened on 31 October 2016. In the process, Junction 34 was remodelled.

The concept was published in the document "Road Plan for Lancashire", in 1948. The idea was revived in 1962 in the Lancashire Development Plan. The first phase, known as the Lancaster and Morecambe bypass, opened in 1994, leaving the Lune crossing and the motorway link unbuilt. Planning permission for this was granted in 2008, with the Department for Transport accepting the "best and final bid offer" and confirming a funding contribution of £111m in 2011. The Secretary of State for Transport gave final approval in March 2013. Over 18,000 vehicles per day used the new road, which had a final cost of £123.9 million, in the year since it was opened.

The road forms part of the A683 Heysham–Kirkby Stephen route. The former route of the A683 through Lancaster has been redesignated the A589.

References
Citations

Sources

Transport in the City of Lancaster
Roads in Lancashire